Igmesine (JO-1,784) is a sigma receptor agonist (IC50 = 39 nM (rat brain)). It has neuroprotective and antidepressant-like effects in animal studies, as well as nootropic effects in models of age-related cognitive decline. In two phase II clinical trials, igmesine was found to be effective in the treatment of depression and was as active as the comparator fluoxetine. However, in a large phase III clinical trial, igmesine failed to show significant effectiveness for depression. The drug has not been developed further.

Synthesis
Use patent designated in conjunction with SSRI:

The first step involves a base catalysed alkylation between 2-phenylbutyric acid [90-27-7] (1) and cinnamyl bromide [4392-24-9] (2) giving 2-ethyl-2,5-diphenylpent-4-enoic acid, CID:53783865 (3). Stepwise treatment of the carboxylic acid with thionyl chloride and sodium azide followed by heating of this compound in an aprotic solvent causes the Curtius rearrangement of the acyl azide (4) to the isocyanate intermediate (5). The reduction of the isocyanate was carried out with lithium aluminium hydride affording the corresponding N-methylamine, i.e. N-Methyl-3,6-diphenylhex-5-en-3-amine, CID:53758312 (6). Schotten-Baumann reaction with cyclopropanoyl chloride [4023-34-1] gives the corresponding amide (7). A second step with lithium aluminium hydride reduces the amide carbonyl completing the synthesis of igmesine (8).

References

Amines
Alkene derivatives
Cyclopropanes
Sigma agonists